HBA360 or Hanetball360 is an maximally inclusive team ball sport that originated in the United States of America (South Florida), in 2006.

The sport gets its name from a combination of the three individual words: Hand, Net and Ball.

Gameplay and rules 
Colloquially referred to as "the Sport of the 21st centaury", Hanetball360 utilizes a concept called QuantumThinking360 as the foundation to its style of gameplay. The premise of the game and concept behind QuantumThinking360 is in a full 360° immersion.

The objective of Hanetball360 is straightforward, to score as many points over the course of the game as possible. The game is played on a regulation rink smooth, clear flat surface; approximately the same dimensions as a traditional basketball court; which measures 157’ 2” long and 70’ wide. by two teams of 11 players (seven active and four reserve). The players use the official game ball, called a hanetball, to score into the opposing teams goal, called a grundnet.

In traditional sports, ranging from basketball to soccer, athletes are only enabled to protect/score from one side, directly in front of them. On the other hand, 360° immersion refers to the fact that the goalposts/grundnets are set up away from the edges of the courts; in such a way that allows athletes access to score from any angle around the posts.

Team composition 
The team composition for Hanetball360 is similar to other team ball sports; 11 athletes per team (seven active and four reserve).

Leagues and teams 
Hanetball360 currently has nine teams of athletes that operate across two leagues worldwide; one league in the state of Florida in the United States and one internationally.

US League 
There are six teams in the Floridian division of the United States Hanetball360 League.

-  Males Teams (four)

 Orlando D'ZINE
 Florida ICAN
 Palm Beach AVAR
 Ft Lauderdale GURU
- Female Teams (two)
 Lake Worth CHARMERS
 Palm Beach DAZZLE

International League  
There are three male teams in the international Hanetball360 League:

 Cuba
 Haiti
 Dominican Republic

International expansion and intellectual property patents 
In the 3rd quarter of 2022, officially began its international expansion to the state of Mumbai in India. Later that year, in Q4 of 2022, the founding members of Hanetball360 began traveling to India to discuss the establishment of Hindu Hanetball360 leagues and franchising the sport across the country.

History 
Hanetball360 was first invented in 1996, by Haitian born Fritz Valdeuz Jr. Two and half years later, in early 1999, the sport began to be regularly played at the local community in Florida.

The first official game of Hanetball360, the "Premier Exhibition Game", was hosted at the Rick Case Arena ( Don Taft University Center at Nova Southeastern University) in Davie, FL, in 2020; and was played by the teams Florida ICAN versus Palm Beach AVAR.

The next ceremonious game, "The First Anniversary Game" was hosted at the Rick Case Arena (Don Taft University Center at Nova Southeastern University) in Davie, FL, on November 28, 2021, by teams Florida ICAN versus Palm Beach AVAR.

The First official Annual matches and the female teams were officially introduced on March 26, 2022, at the Rick Case Arena (Don Taft University Center at Nova Southeastern University) in Davie, FL. In the first half of the event, the female teams, Palm Beach DAZZLE versus Lake Worth Charmers played their first public game. In the second half, the male teams, Palm Beach AVAR versus Ft Lauderdale GURU played their match.

On April 16, 2022, the second Annual match was held at the Rick Case Arena (Don Taft University Center at Nova Southeastern University) in Davie, FL. In the first half of the event, the female teams, Palm Beach DAZZLE versus Lake Worth Charmers played their second public game. In the second half, the male teams, Orlando D'ZINE versus Florida ICAN played their match.

On October 16, 2022, the "Championship Games" were officially launched. Held at the Rick Case Arena (Don Taft University Center at Nova Southeastern University) in Davie, FL; the first match was held between the male teams Orlando D'ZINE versus Ft Lauderdale GURU. The second match held was between the male teams Florida ICAN versus Palm Beach AVAR.

Recognition as a sport 
Since inception, Hanetball360 has gotten recognition from a wide range of public figures including, the NBA legend Cedric Ceballos, as well as, the entire cast of the classic hit Indian show, Mahabharat

On December 23, 2022, the state of Florida has officially recognized Hanetball360 as a sport and dedicated the entire day in honor of the sport.

References 
https://www.prnewswire.com/news-releases/transmedia-group-to-introduce-hanetball360-worlds-first-and-only-360-degree-sport-with-only-circles-no-boundaries-300884365.html

https://www.benzinga.com/pressreleases/21/11/ab24135920/sports-meets-the-metaverse-bitastir-announces-partnership-with-hanetball360

Ball games